Slobodka is a rural locality (a village) in Razinskoye Rural Settlement, Kharovsky District, Vologda Oblast, Russia. The population was 10 as of 2002.

Geography 
Slobodka is located 47 km north of Kharovsk (the district's administrative centre) by road. Lekalikha is the nearest rural locality.

References 

Rural localities in Kharovsky District